Lampruna is a genus of moths in the family Erebidae. The genus was erected by William Schaus in 1894.

Species
Lampruna perflua (Walker, 1869)
Lampruna punctata (Rothschild, 1909)
Lampruna rosea Schaus, 1894
Lampruna rubridorsata Toulgoët & Navatte, 1996

References

External links

Phaegopterina
Moth genera